Glenn T. Freeman (November 15, 1929 – March 20, 2021) was an American politician. He served as a Republican member of the South Dakota House of Representatives.

Life and career 
Freeman was born in Murdo, South Dakota, the son of Lillian and Jesse Freeman. He attended Stamford School.

Freeman was a campground owner in Midland, South Dakota.

In 1979, Freeman was elected to the South Dakota House of Representatives, serving until 1982.

Freeman died in March 2021, at the age of 91.

References 

1929 births
2021 deaths
Republican Party members of the South Dakota House of Representatives
20th-century American politicians
People from Jones County, South Dakota